Before the Blackout is Allister's third studio album.

Release
On July 14, 2005, Before the Blackout was announced for release in three months' time; that same day, "Study in Economics" was made available for streaming. It was released on October 11, 2005 on Drive-Thru Records. Between October and December 2005, they supported Fenix TX on their farewell US tour. They closed the year playing four holiday shows with Catch 22. From late January until early March 2006, the band supported Mest on their tour of the US. In March and April 2007, Allister went on a tour of Japan, before breaking up. They played a final show in Chicago, Illinois.

Track listing
(all songs written by Allister, except where noted otherwise)
 "Waiting" – 3:23
 "D²" – 4:09
 "A Lotta Nerve" (Allister, Dennis Hill) – 2:42
 "From the Ground Up" (Allister, Rory Cleveland) – 2:14
 "Blackout" – 4:08
 "Rewind" – 2:59
 "2 A.M." – 3:32
 "You Lied" – 3:23
 "A Study in Economics" – 3:35
 "Suffocation" – 2:55
 "Easy Answers" (Allister, Hill, Kyle Homme) – 2:55
 "The Legend of Pegleg Sullivan" – 2:45
 "Potential Suicide" – 3:11
 "Alone" – 4:04

Bonus track
The Japanese version of the album, issued through In-n-Out Records, includes a bonus track. The track, sung in Japanese, is a cover version of a 1993 The Boom song.
<li> "Shima Uta" – 3:06

Personnel
 Kyle Lewis - guitar
 Mike Leverence - drums
 Scott Murphy - vocals, bass
 Tim Rogner - vocals, guitar

References

Allister albums
2005 albums
Drive-Thru Records albums